Colonel Jacob Duché (1708–1788) was a mayor of Philadelphia in the colonial province of Pennsylvania.

Duché was born in Philadelphia, the son of Anthony Duché (d. 1762), a French Huguenot who came with his wife to America in the same ship as William Penn in about 1700. He was appointed a colonel of the militia. He served as mayor of Philadelphia from 1761 to 1762. He became a member of the American Philosophical Society through his election in 1768.

He was for many years a vestryman of Christ Church; when the congregation grew too large to be accommodated there, he headed the committee that oversaw the erection of its daughter church, St. Peter's.

Family
Duché married Mary Spence (d. June 5, 1747) on January 13, 1733–34. He later married a widow Bradley, née Esther Duffield.
He was the father of Jacob Duché, chaplain to Continental Congress. He died in Lambeth, England, in 1788.

References

1708 births
1788 deaths
History of Philadelphia
Mayors of Philadelphia
People of colonial Pennsylvania